Edward Karl Linke (November 9, 1911 – June 21, 1988) was a Major League Baseball pitcher. He played all or part of six seasons in the majors, from  until , for the Washington Senators and St. Louis Browns.

Linke was a good hitting pitcher, posting a .263 batting average (41-for-156) with 26 runs, 2 home runs, 17 RBI and 19 bases on balls in 122 games.

External links

Major League Baseball pitchers
Washington Senators (1901–1960) players
St. Louis Browns players
Milwaukee Brewers (minor league) players
Davenport Blue Sox players
Chattanooga Lookouts players
San Antonio Missions players
San Diego Padres (minor league) players
Baltimore Orioles (IL) players
Baseball players from Chicago
1911 births
1988 deaths